Esau de' Buondelmonti was the ruler of Ioannina and its surrounding area (central Epirus) from 1385 until his death in 1411, with the Byzantine title of Despot.

Life
Esau was the son of the Florentine nobleman Manente  and Lapa Acciaiuoli, sister of Niccolò Acciaiuoli of Corinth. Esau had come to Greece to seek success like his Acciaiuoli kinsmen, but in 1379 he had been captured in battle against Thomas Preljubović of Epirus.  After he spent several years of captivity, Esau succeeded his captor by marrying the latter's widow, Maria Angelina Doukaina Palaiologina in February 1385.

Esau reversed the unpopular policies of the tyrannical Thomas, recalling the exiled nobles and reinstating Matthew, the bishop of Ioannina.  The new ruler pursued a pacifying policy, and sought accommodation with both the Albanian clans and the Byzantine Empire.  In 1386 a Byzantine embassy arrived at Ioannina and invested Esau with the court dignity of despotes (despot).  Although Esau was fully independent from Constantinople, this recognition helped strengthen and legitimize his position.

Esau found it difficult, however, to reach an agreement with the Albanians. In 1385 John Spata, despot of Arta, advanced on Ioannina, but Esau managed to prepare the defences so efficiently, that the Albanian leader withdrew.  Esau was forced to follow Thomas' policy of seeking Ottoman support against the Albanians, going to the court of Sultan Murad I to pay homage in 1386.  This alliance brought a respite to the fighting in Epirus, but the conflict flamed up again after the Battle of Kosovo and death of Murad in 1389.  Once again Ioannina was threatened, and once again Esau succeeded in weathering the storm by seeking and obtaining Ottoman support.

Returning to Ioannina after 14 months (1399–1400) at the Ottoman court under Bayezid I, Esau was supported by the Ottoman commander Evrenos and quickly defeated the Albanians.  This bought him four years of peace interrupted only at the end by a conflict with Venice over a disputed port.  The death of Maria in December 1394 was followed by a new conflict with John Bua Spata, which was resolved through diplomacy.  In January 1396 Esau married Spata's daughter Irene as part of the peace settlement.  But peace remained elusive.  No longer needing Turkish support, Esau had clashed with the Turks and defeated them, becoming increasingly confident in his power.

In 1399 Esau, supported by some Albanian clans, marched against his wife's brother-in-law John Zenevisi of Gjirokastër.  Now Esau was routed and captured, and much of his land was occupied by Zenebishi. The neighboring magnates determined to restore the captured despotes and secured Venetian intercession in his favor.  Esau returned to Ioannina in 1400, and reigned on in relative peace until his death on February 6, 1411.

Family

Esau does not appear to have had children by his first wife Maria Angelina Doukaina Palaiologina or by his second wife Irene Spata.  By his third wife Jevdokija Balšić he had three children, including:
 Giorgio de' Buondelmonti, who succeeded as briefly as ruler of Ioannina, before he was deposed by the local nobility, who surrendered their city to Carlo I Tocco.

References
 
 
 
 
 

14th-century births
1411 deaths
14th-century despots of Epirus
15th-century despots of Epirus
Year of birth unknown
14th-century Italian nobility
15th-century Italian nobility
Medieval Ioannina
Esau